Mary Sharp (1778 - 1812), also called Mary Lloyd-Baker or Mary Lloyd Baker, was a niece of the British abolitionist Granville Sharp (1735 – 1813). Mary Sharp herself was an ardent abolitionist, active in campaigns to abolish the Atlantic slave trade.

She married Thomas John Lloyd Baker of Uley, Gloucestershire in 1800. After her death, Baker remarried and built Hardwicke Court.

Places 
Mary Sharp College in Winchester, Tennessee, was named for her.

References

External links 
 Portrait of the Sharp family at the National Portrait Gallery

1778 births
1812 deaths